SSO may refer to:

Organizations
Sarasota County Sheriff's Office, a law enforcement agency in Sarasota County, Florida, US
Social Security Organization, a social welfare organization in Iran
Special Security Office, a function to disseminate sensitive information in the US federal government and armed forces
Special Security Organization, a former Iraqi security agency
Special Source Operations, a division of the US National Security Agency that collects digital data
Standards Setting Organization, a group developing, producing or maintaining technical standards
 SSO VS, Russian Special Operations Forces (Sily Spetsialnykh Operatsiy)
 SSO, Ukrainian Special Operations Forces (Syly Sspetsialʹnykh Operatsiy)
 SSO, Belarusian Special Operations Forces

Orchestras

Salford Symphony Orchestra, England
Saskatoon Symphony Orchestra, Canada
Scottish Symphony Orchestra, Scotland
Seattle Symphony Orchestra, US
Shreveport Symphony Orchestra, US
Singapore Symphony Orchestra, Singapore
Southern Syncopated Orchestra, an early US jazz group that toured the UK and Ireland 1919–21
Springfield Symphony Orchestra, US
Stavanger Symphony Orchestra, Norway
Sudbury Symphony Orchestra, Canada
Sydney Symphony Orchestra, Australia
Syracuse Symphony Orchestra, US

Arts and entertainment
Starship Operators, a Japanese sci-fi novel and anime television series
Super Surgical Operation, a Japanese video game also known as Trauma Center: Under the Knife

Science and technology

Spaceflight
Scaled Composites SpaceShipOne, the vehicle used in the first privately funded human spaceflight
Semi-synchronous orbit, a type of orbit
Single-stage-to-orbit, a reusable vehicle that reaches space without jettisoning hardware
Space Shuttle Orbiter, a reusable space vehicle formerly operated by NASA
Sun-synchronous orbit, a type of orbit
Swiss Space Office, national space program of Switzerland

Computing
Single sign-on, allowing access to multiple software systems using one login
Structure, sequence and organization, a US legal term relating to computer programs and copyright

Electronics
Simultaneous switching output, also known as simultaneous switching noise (SSN), or ground bounce

Astronomy
Siding Spring Observatory, an astronomical observatory in Australia
 Solar System Object

Other uses
Sanitary sewer overflow, when untreated sewage is discharged into the environment
Senior station officer (New Zealand Fire Service), a rank in the New Zealand Fire Service 
Source-separated organics, a system for separating compostable materials from other waste streams
Student Switch Off, a UK-based energy saving campaign
Sydney Star Observer, an LGBT newspaper in Sydney, Australia
South Sudan Oyee!, the national anthem of South Sudan.

See also
Sso (ethnic group), of southern Cameroon
Sso (rite), an initiation rite once practised by the Beti of Cameroon
SS0, a postcode in the SS postcode area